Z-matrix may mean:
 Z-matrix (chemistry), a table of the locations of atoms comprising a molecule
 Z-matrix (mathematics), a matrix whose off-diagonal entries are less than or equal to zero
It may also refer to:
 The matrix of Z-parameters, a matrix characterizing an electrical network